Frederick Lee Frith OBE (30 May 1909 – 24 May 1988 Grimsby, Lincolnshire, England) was a British Grand Prix motorcycle road racing world champion. A former stonemason and later a motor cycle retailer in Grimsby, he was a stylish rider and five times winner of the Isle of Man TT. Frith was one of the few to win TT races before and after the Second World War. He was appointed an Officer of the Order of the British Empire (OBE) in the 1950 Birthday Honours.

Motorcycle racing career
Frith entered his first major race, the first Manx Grand Prix in 1930 riding an over-the counter, 350 cc Velocette KTT in the Junior event, finishing third at a speed of 60.34 mph. He retired from the 500 cc race with a blown engine, again riding his 350, when holding third place.

He won the 1935 Junior Manx Grand Prix and then joined the Norton team for the 1936 TT Races. It was a winning combination as he claimed the Junior TT and finished second in the Senior TT as well as winning the 350cc European Championship. In 1937 he went one better in the Senior and took a brilliant win and setting the first 90 mph plus lap of the Snaefell Mountain Course.

After finishing third in the 1939 Senior he missed the 1947 TT due to a practice spill on a 500cc Moto Guzzi.  Turning to Velocettes in 1948 he won the Junior Race, repeating this success a year later.  Freddie was the first ever 350cc World Champion in 1949, winning all five events of the inaugural campaign, using a single-overhead-camshaft engine in the Ulster race.

Frith, alongside other riders from BSA, Ariel and Matchless works teams, served in the army during World War 2 at the Infantry Driving & Maintenance School stationed at Keswick, where officers and NCOs learned how to ride cross-country.  Sgt. Freddie Frith taught teams of four on Norton 500s over Skiddaw in all weathers.  A special treat on the last day was reserved for roadwork, following Frith's track-style fast cornering.

Motorcycle Grand Prix results 
1949 point system

(key) (Races in italics indicate fastest lap)

Sources

External links
 TT database rider profile iomtt.com
 TT database TT results iomtt.com

British motorcycle racers
English motorcycle racers
500cc World Championship riders
350cc World Championship riders
Manx Grand Prix racers
Isle of Man TT riders
Sportspeople from Grimsby
Officers of the Order of the British Empire
1909 births
1988 deaths
350cc World Riders' Champions